The VAL 206 is one of the VAL series, an automated guideway transit system manufactured by Matra. Because it uses rubber tires, it is suitable for applications that require high acceleration / deceleration.

The train is two-car formation. It is unmanned operation, but it can also be operated manually as needed. It was succeeded by the VAL 208.

Overview
Because of automatic operation, the delay is small, the train density can be increased. On the other hand, since this train is basically a two-car train, it is suitable for low-population areas and medium-sized cities.

Interior
Although the vehicle is small, the window is large, so it is a car with open feeling. Air conditioning is not installed. Plastics are widely used for many parts, but doors and handrail are made of stainless steel. The color tone inside the car varies depending on the railway operator.

Traction equipments 
The control system is a chopper control system using a GTO thyristor and drives a direct current motor. The traction motor is body mounted, and the power is transmitted via the Cardan joint and the hypoid gear.

Operators

References
http://fbrisou.free.fr/RAIL21/FicheVAL206.pdf
https://documents.epfl.ch/users/a/al/allenbac/www/documents/Fich0681.pdf

External links

Electric multiple units of France
Alstom multiple units
750 V DC multiple units